Towns is an unincorporated community in Telfair County, in the U.S. state of Georgia.

History
A post office called Towns was established in 1870, and remained in operation until 1953. Johnson C. Towns, an early postmaster, gave the community his last name.

References

Unincorporated communities in Georgia (U.S. state)
Unincorporated communities in Telfair County, Georgia